In mathematics, the inequality of arithmetic and geometric means, or more briefly the AM–GM inequality, states that the arithmetic mean of a list of non-negative real numbers is greater than or equal to the geometric mean of the same list; and further, that the two means are equal if and only if every number in the list is the same (in which case they are both that number).

The simplest non-trivial case – i.e., with more than one variable – for two non-negative numbers  and , is the statement that 

with equality if and only if . 
This case can be seen from the fact that the square of a real number is always non-negative (greater than or equal to zero) and from the elementary case  of the binomial formula:

<span style="line-height:1.5">Hence , with equality precisely when , i.e. . The AM–GM inequality then follows from taking the positive square root of both sides and then dividing both sides by 2.

For a geometrical interpretation, consider a rectangle with sides of length  and , hence it has perimeter  and area . Similarly, a square with all sides of length  has the perimeter  and the same area as the rectangle. The simplest non-trivial case of the AM–GM inequality implies for the perimeters that  and that only the square has the smallest perimeter amongst all rectangles of equal area.

Extensions of the AM–GM inequality are available to include weights or generalized means.

Background 

The arithmetic mean, or less precisely the average, of a list of  numbers  is the sum of the numbers divided by :

The geometric mean is similar, except that it is only defined for a list of nonnegative real numbers, and uses multiplication and a root in place of addition and division:

If , this is equal to the exponential of the arithmetic mean of the natural logarithms of the numbers:

The inequality 

Restating the inequality using mathematical notation, we have that for any list of  nonnegative real numbers ,

and that equality holds if and only if .

Geometric interpretation 

In two dimensions,  is the perimeter of a rectangle with sides of length  and . Similarly,  is the perimeter of a square with the same area, as that rectangle. Thus for  the AM–GM inequality states that a rectangle of a given area has the smallest perimeter if that rectangle is also a square.

The full inequality is an extension of this idea to  dimensions. Every vertex of an -dimensional box is connected to  edges. There are  vertices, so we multiply this by ; since each edge, however, meets two vertices, every edge is counted twice. Therefore, we divide by  and conclude that there are  edges. On the other hand,

is the total length of edges connected to a vertex on an -dimensional cube of equal volume, since in this case . Since the inequality says

with equality if and only if 
.

Thus the AM–GM inequality states that only the -cube has the smallest sum of lengths of edges connected to each vertex amongst all -dimensional boxes with the same volume.

Examples

Example 1

If , then the A.M.-G.M. tells us that

Example 2

A simple upper bound for  can be found. AM-GM tells us

and so

Equivalently,

Example 3

Consider the function

for all positive real numbers ,  and . Suppose we wish to find the minimal value of this function. It can be rewritten as:

with

Further, we know that the two sides are equal exactly when all the terms of the mean are equal:

All the points  satisfying these conditions lie on a half-line starting at the origin and are given by

Practical applications
An important practical application in financial mathematics is to computing the rate of return: the annualized return, computed via the geometric mean, is less than the average annual return, computed by the arithmetic mean (or equal if all returns are equal). This is important in analyzing investments, as the average return overstates the cumulative effect.

Proofs of the AM–GM inequality

Proof using Jensen's inequality

Jensen's inequality states that the value of a concave function of an arithmetic mean is greater than or equal to the arithmetic mean of the function's values. Since the logarithm function is concave, we have

Taking antilogs of the far left and far right sides, we have the AM–GM inequality.

Proof by successive replacement of elements

We have to show that

with equality only when all numbers are equal. 

If not all numbers are equal, then there exist  such that .

If the numbers are still not equal, we continue replacing numbers as above. After at most  such replacement steps all the numbers will have been replaced with  while the geometric mean strictly increases at each step. After the last step, the geometric mean will be , proving the inequality.

It may be noted that the replacement strategy works just as well from the right hand side. If any of the numbers is 0 then so will the geometric mean thus proving the inequality trivially. Therefore we may suppose that all the numbers are positive. If they are not all equal, then there exist   such that .

. The proof then follows along similar lines as in the earlier replacement.

Induction proofs

Proof by induction #1

Of the non-negative real numbers , the AM–GM statement is equivalent to

with equality if and only if  for all .

For the following proof we apply mathematical induction and only well-known rules of arithmetic.

Induction basis:  For  the statement is true with equality.

Induction hypothesis: Suppose that the AM–GM statement holds for all choices of  non-negative real numbers.

Induction step: Consider  non-negative real numbers , . Their arithmetic mean  satisfies

Then

Now define  with

and consider the  numbers  which are all non-negative. Since

Thus,  is also the arithmetic mean of  numbers  and the induction hypothesis implies

Due to (*) we know that

hence

in particular . Therefore, if at least one of the numbers  is zero, then we already have strict inequality in (**). Otherwise the right-hand side of (**) is positive and strict inequality is obtained by using the estimate (***) to get a lower bound of the right-hand side of (**). Thus, in both cases we can substitute (***) into (**) to get

which completes the proof.

Proof by induction #2 

First of all we shall prove that for real numbers  and  there follows

 

whence the required inequality is obtained immediately.

Now, we are going to prove that for positive real numbers  satisfying
, there holds

The equality holds only if .

Induction basis:  For  the statement is true because of the above property.

Induction step: Consider natural number , i.e. for positive real numbers , there holds . There exists at least one , so there must be at least one .

Then, the induction hypothesis implies

However, taking into account the induction basis, we have

which completes the proof.

For positive real numbers , let's denote

The numbers  satisfy the condition . So we have

whence we obtain

Proof by Cauchy using forward–backward induction

The following proof by cases relies directly on well-known rules of arithmetic but employs the rarely used technique of forward-backward-induction. It is essentially from Augustin Louis Cauchy and can be found in his Cours d'analyse.

The case where all the terms are equal 

If all the terms are equal:

The case where not all the terms are equal 

It remains to show that if not all the terms are equal, then the arithmetic mean is greater than the geometric mean. Clearly, this is only possible when .

This case is significantly more complex, and we divide it into subcases.

The subcase where n = 2 

hence

as desired.

The subcase where n = 2k 

Consider the case where , where  is a positive integer. We proceed by mathematical induction.

In the base case, so . We have already shown that the inequality holds when , so we are done.

To do so, we apply the inequality twice for  numbers and once for  numbers to obtain:

where in the first inequality, the two sides are equal only if

and

(in which case the first arithmetic mean and first geometric mean are both equal to , and similarly with the second arithmetic mean and second geometric mean); and in the second inequality, the two sides are only equal if the two geometric means are equal. Since not all  numbers are equal, it is not possible for both inequalities to be equalities, so we know that:

as desired.

The subcase where n < 2k 

If  is not a natural power of , then it is certainly less than some natural power of 2, since the sequence  is unbounded above. Therefore, without loss of generality, let  be some natural power of  that is greater than .

So, if we have  terms, then let us denote their arithmetic mean by , and expand our list of terms thus:

We then have:

 

so

and

as desired.

Proof by induction using basic calculus

The following proof uses mathematical induction and some basic differential calculus.

Induction basis: For  the statement is true with equality.

Induction hypothesis: Suppose that the AM–GM statement holds for all choices of  non-negative real numbers.

Induction step: In order to prove the statement for  non-negative real numbers , we need to prove that

with equality only if all the  numbers are equal.

If all numbers are zero, the inequality holds with equality. If some but not all numbers are zero, we have strict inequality. Therefore, we may assume in the following, that all  numbers are positive.

We consider the last number  as a variable and define the function

Proving the induction step is equivalent to showing that  for all , with  only if  and  are all equal. This can be done by analyzing the critical points of  using some basic calculus.

A critical point  has to satisfy , which means

After a small rearrangement we get

and finally

This is the only critical point of . Since  for all , the function  is strictly convex and has a strict global minimum at . Next we compute the value of the function at this global minimum:

where the final inequality holds due to the induction hypothesis. The hypothesis also says that we can have equality only when  are all equal. In this case, their geometric mean   has the same value, Hence, unless  are all equal, we have . This completes the proof.

This technique can be used in the same manner to prove the generalized AM–GM inequality and Cauchy–Schwarz inequality in Euclidean space .

Proof by Pólya using the exponential function

George Pólya provided a proof similar to what follows. Let  for all real , with first derivative  and second derivative .

Consider a list of non-negative real numbers . If they are all zero, then the AM–GM inequality holds with equality. Hence we may assume in the following for their arithmetic mean . By -fold application of the above inequality, we obtain that

with equality if and only if  for every . The argument of the exponential function can be simplified:

which produces , hence the result

Proof by Lagrangian multipliers

Because the arithmetic and geometric means are homogeneous of degree 1, without loss of generality assume that . Let us first show that the constrained minimization problem has a global minimum.

Set .

We will show that the only point at which this happens is when  and   

Compute 
 
and

 

along the constraint.

Generalizations

Weighted AM–GM inequality

There is a similar inequality for the weighted arithmetic mean and weighted geometric mean. Specifically, let the nonnegative numbers   and the nonnegative weights  be given. Set . If , then the inequality

 

Here the convention  is used.

If all , this reduces to the above inequality of arithmetic and geometric means.

One stronger version of this, which also gives strengthened version of the unweighted version, is due to Aldaz. In particular, 
There is a similar inequality for the weighted arithmetic mean and weighted geometric mean. Specifically, let the nonnegative numbers   and the nonnegative weights  be given.  Assume further that 
the sum of the weights is 1. Then .

Proof using Jensen's inequality

Using the finite form of Jensen's inequality for the natural logarithm, we can prove the inequality between the weighted arithmetic mean and the weighted geometric mean stated above.

If all  are equal, then equality holds. Therefore, it remains to prove strict inequality if they are not all equal, which we will assume in the following, too. If at least one  is zero (but not all), then the weighted geometric mean is zero, while the weighted arithmetic mean is positive, hence strict inequality holds. Therefore, we may assume also that all  are positive.

Since the natural logarithm is strictly concave, the finite form of Jensen's inequality and the functional equations of the natural logarithm imply

Since the natural logarithm is strictly increasing,

Matrix arithmetic–geometric mean inequality
In  Bhatia and Kittaneh proved that for any unitarily invariant norm  and positive semi-definite matrices  and  it is the case that

Later, in  the same authors proved the stronger inequality that 

Finally, it is known for dimension  that the following strongest possible matrix generalization of the arithmetic-geometric mean inequality holds, and it is conjectured to hold for all 

This conjectured inequality was shown by Stephen Drury in 2012. Indeed, he proved

Other generalizations

Other generalizations of the inequality of arithmetic and geometric means include:

 Muirhead's inequality,
 Maclaurin's inequality,
 Generalized mean inequality,
 Means of complex numbers.

See also
Hoffman's packing puzzle
Ky Fan inequality
Young's inequality for products

References

External links
 

Inequalities
Means
Articles containing proofs